Sylvia Eichner (born 6 June 1957) is a German swimmer who won a silver medal in the 4 × 100 m freestyle relay at the 1972 Summer Olympics. She also won a gold medal in the same event at the 1973 World Aquatics Championships, setting a new world record.

References

1957 births
Living people
German female swimmers
Swimmers at the 1972 Summer Olympics
East German female freestyle swimmers
Olympic swimmers of East Germany
Olympic silver medalists for East Germany
Medalists at the 1972 Summer Olympics
Swimmers from Dresden
World Aquatics Championships medalists in swimming